In abstract algebra, the group isomorphism problem is the decision problem of determining whether two given finite group presentations refer to isomorphic groups.

The isomorphism problem was formulated by Max Dehn, and together with the word problem and conjugacy problem, is one of three fundamental decision problems in group theory he identified in 1911. All three problems are undecidable: there does not exist a computer algorithm that correctly solves every instance of the isomorphism problem, or of the other two problems, regardless of how much time is allowed for the algorithm to run. In fact the problem of deciding whether a group is trivial is undecidable, a consequence of the Adian–Rabin theorem due to Sergei Adian and Michael O. Rabin.

References
 
 

Group theory
Undecidable problems